Mojtame-ye Meskuni Shahid Abbaspur (also Romanized as Mojtame`-ye Meskūnī Shahīd ʿAbbāspūr) is a village in Kuhdasht-e Sharqi Rural District, in the Central District of Miandorud County, Mazandaran Province, Iran. At the 2006 census, its population was 279, in 74 families.

References 

Populated places in Miandorud County